Paxtakor is a city in Jizzakh Region, Uzbekistan. It is the capital of Paxtakor District. It had a population of 15,366 in 1989, and 23,900 in 2016.
In 1974 Paxtakor was granted city status. The city has a cotton-cleaning factory.

Meaning
The word Pakhta(پخته) in Persian means cotton and kor from kar-, kardan(کار، کردن) "to do, to make", produces a job name from a noun.

References

Populated places in Jizzakh Region
Cities in Uzbekistan